The Stockton School is a historic building in Stockton, Utah, United States. It was built in 1912.  In 2019, it currently houses the Stockton Town Hall.

It was listed on the National Register of Historic Places in 2018.

References

Schools in Utah
National Register of Historic Places in Tooele County, Utah
School buildings completed in 1912
1912 establishments in Utah